The Gippsland V/Line rail service or Bairnsdale Line is a passenger service operated by V/Line in Victoria, Australia between Melbourne and the Gippsland region including the regional cities of Moe, Morwell, Traralgon, Sale and Bairnsdale. It operates along the Gippsland railway line.

History

Although the Gippsland line was extended to Orbost in 1916, from the 1930s passenger services along the line extended only as far as Bairnsdale. In 1954 the line beyond Dandenong was electrified as far as Traralgon, with services from this time provided by the L class electric locomotives.

In 1975 suburban services were extended from Dandenong to Pakenham, on what is known as the Pakenham railway line. By the 1980s the motive power of trains reverted to diesel locomotives, with electrification cut back to Warragul in 1987, and to Bunyip in 1998. Suburban Comeng trains were used by V/Line to provide services from Melbourne to Warragul in the late 1980s and early 1990s.

In 1993, passenger services from Sale to Bairnsdale were withdrawn. They were reinstated in 2004 as part of the Linking Victoria program. The line was upgraded as part of the Regional Fast Rail project in 2005 and the last of the overhead wires were removed, except for a short section to the Melbourne side of Bunyip station.

In March 2013 the service was suspended east of Traralgon because of safety problems with level crossings. Rail services resumed in October 2013.

Services
Services to Traralgon operate approximately hourly every day, with a higher frequency during the weekday peak periods. A those six stations, trains running towards Traralgon only pick up passengers, trains running towards Southern Cross and only set down passengers. One morning peak service terminates and originates at Flinders Street instead of Southern Cross. During weekdays off-peak, Richmond station is only served by trains to Traralgon in the afternoon and evening.

From Monday to Saturday there are three daily return services to Bairnsdale, and two return services to Bairnsdale, one return service to Sale on Sunday. At Bairnsdale, trains connect with road coach services to Orbost, Batemans Bay and Canberra. One service in each direction daily is run using locomotive-hauled N type carriages, which provide first-class accommodation and a snack bar. Other services are operated by VLocity diesel multiple units, which are single-class and have no refreshment facilities. Some services stop all stations between Pakenham and Bairnsdale, while others (typically locomotive-hauled services) run semi-express between Melbourne and Moe.

Line Guide

References

External links
http://www.vline.com.au
Official map
Statistics and detailed schematic map at the vicsig enthusiast website

V/Line rail services
Traralgon
Transport in Gippsland (region)
Shire of Baw Baw
Public transport routes in the City of Melbourne (LGA)
Transport in the City of Yarra
Transport in the City of Glen Eira
Transport in the City of Monash
Transport in the Shire of Cardinia
Transport in the City of Greater Dandenong